Krishnapur Madanpur is a village in the Barasat II CD block in the Barasat Sadar subdivision of the North 24 Parganas district in the state of West Bengal, India.

Geography

Location

Area overview
The area covered in the map alongside is largely a part of the north Bidyadhari Plain. located in the lower Ganges Delta. The country is flat. It is a little raised above flood level and the highest ground borders the river channels. 54.67% of the people of the densely populated area lives in the urban areas and 45.33% lives in the rural  areas.

Note: The map alongside presents some of the notable locations in the subdivision. All places marked in the map are linked in the larger full screen map.

Civic administration

CD block HQ
The headquarters of Barasat II CD block are located at Krishnapur Madanpur.

Demographics
According to the 2011 Census of India, Krishnapur Madanpur had a total population of 3,015, of which 1,570 (52%) were males and 1,445 (48%) were females. Population in the age range 0–6 years was 365. The total number of literate persons in Krishnapur Madanpur was 2,040 (76.98% of the population over 6 years).

Transport
Badu Road links Krishnapur Madanpur to National Highway 12 (old numbering NH 34) at Madhyamgram and a link from Badu Road connects it to State Highway 2 (locally known as Taki Road).

Healthcare
Bagband Siberia primary health centre is located nearby.

See also
Map of Barasat II CD Block on Page 419 of District Census Handbook.

References

Villages in North 24 Parganas district